Al-Wakrah Sport Club is a Qatari professional sports club based in Al Wakrah. Their professional football team competes in the Qatar Stars League and play their home games at the Al Janoub Stadium.

Name history
1959: Founded as Al-Wakrah Youth Club
1967: Changed name to Al-Wakrah Sport Club

History
Al Wakrah was founded in 1959, and was officially legitimized in 1965 under the name of Al Wakrah Youth Club. From that time, its football and handball sections were formed, with both participating in local competitions. It later changed its name to Al Wakrah Sports Club in 1967. Over the years, it branched out to many sports, including chess, basketball, and bowling.

The original club headquarters at Al Wakrah Stadium was constructed in 1984, and tennis and squash teams were also formed during this time in addition to its previously formed sports teams. They won the Qatari league twice, once in 1999 and again in 2001.

The new club headquarters is Al Janoub Stadium, inaugurated in 2019 as one of the FIFA World Cup 2022 Qatar sites and was designed by Zaha Hadid.

Honours
Qatar Stars League
 Winners (2): 1998–99, 2000–01

Qatar Crown Prince Cup
 Winners (1): 1999

Qatar Sheikh Jassem Cup
 Winners (4): 1989, 1991, 1998, 2004

Qatari Stars Cup
 Winners (1): 2011

Qatari Second Division:
Winners (2): 1984–85, 2018–19

Players
As of Qatar Stars League:

League records
Last update: 23 February 2012. 
Apps and goals in the QSL only

Managerial history

As of 24 May 2012.

 Ashour Salem (c. 1970s)
 Mamdouh Khafaji (c. 1980s)
 Len Ashurst (1988–89)
 Alcides Romano Junior (1989)
 Hassan Ali Sheeb (1989)
 Flamarion Nunes (1989–91)
 Costică Ştefănescu (1991–92)
 Len Ashurst (1993–95)
 Khalifa Khamis (1995)
 José Paulo Rubim (1995)
 Adnan Dirjal (1995–98)
 Rabah Madjer (1998–99)
 Ivan Buljan (1999)
 Adnan Dirjal (1999–00)
 José Paulo Rubim (2000–01)
 Paul Dolezar (2001)
 Mejbel Fartous (2001–02)
 Nebojsa Vučković (2002–03)
 Džemal Hadžiabdić (1 July 2003–30 June 2004)
 Adnan Dirjal (2004–Dec 05)
 Frank Tyson &  Mohammed Al Shaibani (CT) (Dec 2005–Jan 06)
 Saeed Al-Misnad (Jan 06)
 Hassan Hormutallah (Jan 2006–06)
 Mehmed Baždarević (1 July 2006–30 June 2007)
 Adnan Dirjal (2007)
 Mustapha Madih (2007)
 Reiner Hollmann (2007)
 Mejbel Fartous (2007)
 Richard Tardy (2007–08)
 Goran Miscević (2008)
 Adnan Dirjal (2008)
 Mustapha Madih (Jul 2008–Jun, 2010)
 Adnan Dirjal (1 Oct 2010–9 June 2012)
 Mehmed Baždarević (10 June 2012–3 June 2013)
 Adnan Dirjal (8 May 2013–12 March 2014)
 Maher Kanzari (1 June 2014–28 Oct 2014)
 Noureddine Zekri (28 Oct 2014–20 Feb, 2015)
 Goran Tufegdžić (22 Feb 2015–Jun 2015)
 Mauricio Larriera (Jul 2015–Nov 2016)
 Kais Yâakoubi ( Nov 2016–Jun 2017
 Tintín Márquez (Jan 2018–)

Individual honours
2009 FIFA Confederations Cup
The following players have played in the FIFA Confederations Cup:
 2009 – Karrar Jassim
 2009 – Ali Rehema

Performance in AFC competitions
 Asian Club Championship: 2 appearances

2001: First Round
2002: First Round

Asian clubs ranking

Other sports

Basketball

References

External links
 Official website

 
Football clubs in Qatar
Association football clubs established in 1959
Sport in Al Wakrah
1959 establishments in Qatar